Engaewa similis is a species of Australian crayfish in the family Parastacidae.

Distribution and conservation
E. similis is endemic to the Augusta region in Western Australia, and can be found from the Margaret River to the vicinity of Windy Harbour. Although previously considered an endangered species, E. similis is now listed as a species of Least Concern on the IUCN Red List, since it is abundant at the sites where it persists.

Description
An adult female holotype (a single physical example of the species) was found in Augusta, Western Australia by L. P. Smith in 1961.

References

Parastacidae
Freshwater crustaceans of Australia
Endangered fauna of Australia
Taxonomy articles created by Polbot
Crustaceans described in 1967